Henry Joseph Wilke (December 14, 1900 – June 21, 1991) was a third baseman in Major League Baseball. He played for the Chicago Cubs in 1927.

References

External links

1900 births
1991 deaths
Major League Baseball third basemen
Chicago Cubs players
Baseball players from Cincinnati